Anahid Fayad (born 6 July 1983 in Damascus) is a Palestinian actress, she is known for her roles in Syrian drama, and her dubbing in Turkish drama. Her father Ali Fayad is a Palestinian diplomat born in Gaza. She acted in Bab Al-Hara, 42 days, Seraa Ala El Remal, 3000 Nights. She played Filiz in the Turkish series Ihlamurlar Altında. She is married to Jordanian Telecommunications and Technology minister Mothanna Gharaibeh, she held Jordanian citizenship since that.

Works

Series 
 Escape to summit (2003)
 Palestinian taxonomy (2004)
 Me and 4 girls (2004)
 City of Information (2004)
 Little thorns (2005)
 Stick of Tears (2005)
 Houri (2005)
 Little projects (2006)
 People of love (2006)
 Bab Al-Hara (2006-2015)
 Prisoner of revenge (2007)
 House of my grandfather (2008)
 Features of human beings (2008)
 Seraa Ala El Remal (2008)
 When ethics rebel (2008)
 Face of Justice (2008)
 Another life (2009)
 Summer cloud (2009)
 Our Story don't end (2012)
 42 days (2016)

Films 
 For all night (2009)
 3000 Nights (2015)

Dubbing 
 Çemberimde Gül Oya (2004) as Zarife'nin Gençliği
 Ihlamurlar Altında (2005-2007) as Filiz
 Asi (2007-2009) as Asi
 Gonulcelen (2010) as Hasret

References

External links 
 Anahid Fayad in IMDb

1983 births
Living people
Jordanian actresses
Syrian actresses
21st-century Palestinian actresses
Palestinian television actresses
Syrian television actresses
Syrian film actresses
Syrian voice actresses
Syrian people of Palestinian descent
Naturalized citizens of Jordan
Jordanian people of Palestinian descent